Gatcombe Park is the country residence of Anne, Princess Royal, between the villages of Minchinhampton (to which it belongs) and Avening in Gloucestershire, England. Built in the late 18th century to the designs of George Basevi, it is a Grade II* listed building.  It is a royal residence as it is home to the Princess Royal, and is privately owned. Parts of the grounds open for events, including horse trials and craft fairs.

Location
Gatcombe Park is between the villages of Minchinhampton and Avening in Gloucestershire in South West England. The first cousin of their mother, the late Queen, Prince Michael of Kent, owned nearby Nether Lypiatt Manor for 26 years from 1980.

History
The manors of Minchinhampton and Avening formed the basis of the later Gatcombe Park estate. After the Dissolution of the Monasteries they were granted to Lord Windsor, whose family sold mostly undeveloped land by that date comprising them to Philip Sheppard in 1656.

The core hillside land of the former estates, which was chiefly within the parish bounds of Gatcombe, was left in the will of Samuel Sheppard, who died in 1770, to his brother Edward.

Accordingly, a new manor house was built from 1771 to 1774 for Edward Sheppard, a local clothier. The house and estate were purchased in 1814 by the successful speculator and theoretical economist David Ricardo, MP, and altered to the designs of George Basevi (a relation), c.1820. It features Bath stone construction, and comprises five main bedrooms, four secondary bedrooms, four reception rooms, a library, a billiard room and a conservatory; staff accommodation and its steep-sloping grounds are a separately listed (Grade II) parkland.

Residence of the Princess Royal
The house and home farm were bought by Queen Elizabeth II in 1976 for Princess Anne and Captain Mark Phillips; the price was not disclosed but is believed to have been between £500,000 and £750,000. The previous owner was Lord Butler of Saffron Walden, Master of Trinity College, Cambridge, and a former Home Secretary, who had inherited the house from his father-in-law, the art collector Samuel Courtauld. Courtauld had acquired it from the Ricardo family in 1940.

The Crown paid for the renovation and redecoration of the house for Princess Anne and Captain Phillips, who moved into it in November 1977. In 1978 the owners' land was increased by the purchase of Aston Farm to the east. These properties had extensive stabling for horses, including a new stable block, and the underlying land of an airstrip is within the ownership of Aston Farm.

The estate was divided when the Princess Royal and Mark Phillips were divorced, and today the princess lives at Gatcombe Park with her second husband, Sir Timothy Laurence. After the divorce, for some years Mark Phillips lived at Aston Farm with his second wife, but he later moved to the United States. Their children Peter and Zara Phillips each had a cottage on the estate until they married. Peter and his wife, Autumn, then moved to London; they separated in 2019, and in 2020 announced they would divorce. Zara and her husband, Mike Tindall, at first lived in Cheltenham after they were married in 2011, but in January 2013 they sold their house and came to live on the Gatcombe estate.

The grounds of Gatcombe Park are known in the eventing world for hosting the Festival of British Eventing every year, over the first weekend in August. Organised by Mark Phillips, with considerable input from Princess Anne, the event attracts the world's top equestrian Olympians and over 40,000 paying spectators, as well as BBC Television coverage. Two smaller horse trials, in the spring and autumn, also take place on the estate, with courses designed by Princess Anne, and there is a biannual craft fair, with around 160 exhibitors, in May and October.

References

Anne, Princess Royal
Country houses in Gloucestershire
George Basevi buildings
Grade II* listed houses
Grade II* listed buildings in Gloucestershire
Houses completed in 1774
Royal residences in England